Komiaviatrans is a regional airline from Russia, which operates mostly domestic regional flights from Komi Republic. Its headquarter located in Syktyvkar.

Destinations
Komivaiatrans operates scheduled flights to the following domestic destinations:

Domestic
Arkhangelsk Oblast
Arkhangelsk - Talagi Airport
Kotlas - Kotlas Airport

Belgorod Oblast
Belgorod - Belgorod International Airport

Kaluga Oblast
Kaluga - Grabtsevo Airport secondary base

Komi
Inta - Inta Airport
Koslan - Koslan Airport
Pechora - Pechora Airport
Syktyvkar - Syktyvkar Airport base
Troitsko-Pechorsk - Troitsko-Pechorsk Airport
Ukhta - Ukhta Airport focus city
Usinsk - Usinsk Airport focus city
Ust-Tsilma - Ust-Tsilma Airport
Vorkuta - Vorkuta Airport
Vuktyl - Vuktyl Airport

Krasnodar Krai
Anapa - Vityazevo Airport seasonal
Krasnodar - Pashkovsky Airport seasonal
Sochi - Adler-Sochi International Airport seasonal

Moscow / Moscow Oblast
Moscow Domodedovo Airport

Nizhny Novgorod Oblast
Nizhny Novgorod - Strigino International Airport

Perm Krai
Perm - Bolshoye Savino Airport

St Petersburg / Leningrad Oblast
Pulkovo Airport

Samara Oblast
Samara - Kurumoch International Airport

Saratov Oblast
Saratov - Saratov Tsentralny Airport

Stavropol Krai
Mineralnye Vody - Mineralnye Vody Airport

Sverdlovsk Oblast
Yekaterinburg - Koltsovo Airport

Tatarstan
Nizhnekamsk - Begishevo Airport

International
Azerbaijan
Baku - Heydar Aliyev International Airport (begins 25 August 2016)

Fleet

, the Komiaviatrans fleet consists of the following aircraft:

In addition Komiavaiatrans Airlines operates 3 Mi-2 and 29 Mi-8 helicopters.

References

External links

Official website 

Airlines of Russia
Companies based in Syktyvkar
Airlines established in 1998